In mathematics, specifically in complex analysis, Fatou's theorem, named after Pierre Fatou, is a statement concerning holomorphic functions on the unit disk and their pointwise extension to the boundary of the disk.

Motivation and statement of theorem

If we have a holomorphic function  defined on the open unit disk , it is reasonable to ask under what conditions we can extend this function to the boundary of the unit disk. To do this, we can look at what the function looks like on each circle inside the disk centered at 0, each with some radius . This defines a new function:

 

where 

is the unit circle. In particular, if the  norms of these  are well behaved, we have an answer:

Theorem. Let  be a holomorphic function such that
 
where  are defined as above. Then  converges to some function  pointwise almost everywhere and in  norm. That is,

Now, notice that this pointwise limit is a radial limit. That is, the limit being taken is along a straight line from the center of the disk to the boundary of the circle, and the statement above hence says that

The natural question is, with this boundary function defined, will we converge pointwise to this function by taking a limit in any other way? That is, suppose instead of following a straight line to the boundary, we follow an arbitrary curve  converging to some point  on the boundary. Will  converge to ? (Note that the above theorem is just the special case of ). It turns out that the curve  needs to be non-tangential, meaning that the curve does not approach its target on the boundary in a way that makes it tangent to the boundary of the circle. In other words, the range of  must be contained in a wedge emanating from the limit point. We summarize as follows:

Definition. Let  be a continuous path such that . Define
 

Fatou's Theorem. Let  Then for almost all 

for every non-tangential limit  converging to  where  is defined as above.

Discussion
 The proof utilizes the symmetry of the Poisson kernel using the Hardy–Littlewood maximal function for the circle. 
 The analogous theorem is frequently defined for the Hardy space over the upper-half plane and is proved in much the same way.

See also
Hardy space

References
 John B. Garnett, Bounded Analytic Functions, (2006) Springer-Verlag, New York

 Walter Rudin. Real and Complex Analysis (1987), 3rd Ed., McGraw Hill, New York.
 Elias Stein, Singular integrals and differentiability properties of functions (1970), Princeton University Press, Princeton.

Theorems in complex analysis